Xanthophyllum pubescens is a species of plant in the family Polygalaceae. It is endemic to Peninsular Malaysia.

References

pubescens
Endemic flora of Peninsular Malaysia
Conservation dependent plants
Taxonomy articles created by Polbot